Christian C. Wellensgard (July 29, 1849 – November 15, 1926) was a member of the Wisconsin State Assembly.

Biography
Wellensgard was born on July 29, 1849, in Denmark. He later moved to Berlin, Wisconsin. He died in Berlin, Wisconsin on November 15, 1926.

Career
Wellensgard was elected to the Assembly in 1905 and re-elected in 1906. He was investigated for vote buying in 1909. Additionally, he was a member of the Berlin School Board and the Berlin Common Council. He was a Republican.

References

Danish emigrants to the United States
People from Berlin, Wisconsin
Republican Party members of the Wisconsin State Assembly
Wisconsin city council members
School board members in Wisconsin
1849 births
1926 deaths